Liu Yali (born 26 August 1968) is a Chinese alpine skier. She competed in three events at the 1992 Winter Olympics.

References

1968 births
Living people
Chinese female alpine skiers
Olympic alpine skiers of China
Alpine skiers at the 1992 Winter Olympics
Skiers from Jilin